Max Nomad (1881, Buchach, Halychyna, now Ukraine – 1973) is the pseudonym of Austrian author and educator Maximilian Nacht. In his youth he had espoused militant anarchism and in the 1920s he was a follower of the Bolshevik Revolution. From the 1940s he was for many years a politics lecturer in the United States.

Background 

Maximilian Nacht was born in 1881, into a wealthy Jewish family from Buchach, eastern Halychyna, now Ukraine.  Before World War I, he lived in Austria and attended the University of Vienna.

Career
Max, his older brother Siegfried and, sometimes, Senna Hoy in Zürich from 1903 to 1907 edited five volumes of the militant journal Der Weckruf (The Alarm). In 1908 he was living in Cracow, where he became politically involved with Jan Wacław Machajski in setting up Workers' Conspiracy. Siegfried, later Stephen, emigrated to the United States of America at the end of 1912, Max followed in 1913.<ref>Siegfried Nacht also used the pen-name Arnold Roller: Der Generalstreik und die soziale Revolution. London 1902 (translated into 17 languages); Der soziale Generalstreik. Berlin 1905; Die direkte Aktion London 1906. Sodatenbrevier, 1906.</ref>

Nacht wrote pro-Soviet articles in the 1920s using the pseudonym "Max Nomad." He distanced himself from Stalinism in 1929. Writing in Scribner's Magazine in 1934, he coined the phrase capitalism without capitalists regarding the Soviet Union.

A Guggenheim Fellow in 1937, he became a lecturer in politics and history at New York University, the New School for Social Research and the Rand School of Social Science.

Nomad wrote of himself:    I remain a lone-wolf philosophical anarchist whose sympathies go out to the poorest of the poor struggling for more and more of the good things of life. But I feel akin only to those rebellious, but politically unattached intellectuals who dream of justice and an equal chance for everybody, but know, as I do, that, given the eternal recurrence of predatory elites, and the incurable ignorance and gullibility of the masses, a privileged and educated minority will always rule and exploit the uneducated majority.  

 Works
 Die revolutionäre Bewegung in Rußland. Neues Leben, Berlin 1902
 Rebellen-Lieder Arnold Roller (Siegfried Nacht), Max Nacht (eds,.),  1906
 Rebels and Renegades. New York 1932. 430 pp.
 Apostles of Revolution. Little, Brown & Co., Boston 1939. 467 pp.
 A Skeptic's Political Dictionary and Handbook for the Disenchanted. New York 1953. 171 pp.
 Aspects of Revolt. New York [1959]. 311 pp.
 Political Heretics from Plato to Mao Tse-Tung. Ann Arbor 1963
 Dreamers, Dynamiters and Demagogues: Reminiscences. New York [1964]. 251 pp.
 The Anarchist Tradition and Other Essays. 1967. 398 pp.
 Masters--old and new 1979
 White collars & horny hands: the revolutionary thought of Waclaw Machajski 1983

References

Further reading
 Werner Portmann: Die wilden Schafe: Max und Siegfried Nacht''. Unrast Verlag, Münster (Germany) 2008.

1881 births
1973 deaths
American anarchists
Anarchist theorists
Jewish anarchists
People from Buchach
Austrian emigrants to the United States